Bukene is a town and a ward in central Tanzania. It is located in Nzega District of Tabora Region.

According to the 2012 Tanzania National Census, the population of Bukene Ward was 7,641.

Transport 

It is served by a station on the Central Line railway of Tanzania.

References 

Wards of Tabora Region